Hydriomena hemizona is a species of moth in the family Geometridae. It was first described by Edward Meyrick in 1897. This species is endemic to New Zealand. The classification of New Zealand endemic moths within the genus Hydriomena is regarded as unsatisfactory and in need of revision. As such this species is currently also known as Hydriomena (s.l.) hemizona.

References 

Sterrhinae
Moths described in 1897
Moths of New Zealand
Endemic fauna of New Zealand
Taxa named by Edward Meyrick
Endemic moths of New Zealand